Pavilion Road is a street in Chelsea in the Royal Borough of Kensington and Chelsea, London. It runs parallel to Sloane Street and is accessed from Sloane Square in the southern end and Basil Street in the northern end.

Following a consultation with the local community in the middle of 2015, Cadogan pledged to create a destination for independent, artisan traders behind the new George House development on Sloane Street. Established fashion and beauty boutiques were joined by new artisan food shops in November 2016.

The MICA (Modern Islamic and Contemporary Art) Gallery is an art gallery located near the Cadogan Gardens intersection. The gallery, founded by  Reedah El-Saie in 2007, is a 1500 square foot gallery specialising in modern and contemporary Islamic art. The gallery is known for its promotion of British-Pakistani art.

References

Streets in the Royal Borough of Kensington and Chelsea
Knightsbridge